Charles Lewis Woodruff (19 January 1884 – 17 July 1943) was an English professional footballer who played for Grantham Avenue, Tottenham Hotspur, Doncaster Rovers and Grantham Town.

Career 
Woodruff began his career at his local Non league club Grantham Avenue. The outside right joined Tottenham Hotspur in 1908 and scored one goal in 10 appearances for the Lilywhites. After leaving White Hart Lane, Woodruff went on to play for Doncaster Rovers and finally ending his career at Grantham Town from 1913, playing in some war games till 1916.

References 

1884 births
1943 deaths
People from Grantham
English footballers
English Football League players
Grantham Avenue F.C. players
Tottenham Hotspur F.C. players
Doncaster Rovers F.C. players
Grantham Town F.C. players
Midland Football League players
Association football forwards